Fredrik Luhr Dietrichson (born 5 February 1988 in Haugesund, Norway) is a Norwegian Upright bassist.

Career 
Dietrichson holds a Bachelor's degree in Music Performance by the Jazz program at Trondheim Musikkonsevatorium, where he and some fellow students started the trio "Moskus" including Anja Lauvdal (piano) & Hans Hulbækmo (drums). They won the debutant award by the label Grappa (2011), and was a finalist in this year "JazzIntro". The three young musicians from Haugesund, Flekkefjord and Tolga, Norway also made positively noted in other constellations than the trio, as it has been linked to significant anticipation debut album Salmesykkel (2012), which was launched with a concert at the National Jazz scene, "Victoria" in Oslo. "Moskus" is a picture rich and popular melody and rhythm, circling around phrases and figures rather than more complete compositions and emphasis on sound and chords rather than improvised single note lines with complete closer, and is closer to pop / rock tracks of The Bad Plus and Esbjörn Svensson Trio than more orthodox jazztrioers. Some gospel moods may point towards Tord Gustavsen Trio.

Dietrichson has also been involved the establishment of the bands "Shotgun", "Maren Trio", Philip Schjetlein Trio, the trio "Wolfram" with the self-titled debut album Wolfram (2012) and the duo "PGA" with the debut album Corrections (2012). On Corrections the "PGA" duo is assisted by Henrik Munkeby Nørstebø (trombone) and Thorsten Lavik Larsen (trumpet) on two tracs.

Honors 
2010: Sildajazzprisen
2011: The label Grappa debutant award, within "Moscus"

Discography 
Within Wolfram Trio including Halvor Meling (saxophone) & Jan Martin Gismervik (drums)
2012: Wolfram (Va Fongool)

Within PGA duo including Jan Martin Gismervik (drums)
2012: Corrections (Va Fongool)

Within Moskus Trio including Anja Lauvdal (piano) & Hans Hulbækmo (drums)
2012: Salmesykkel (Hubro)
2014: Mestertyven (Hubro)
2016: Ulv Ulv (Hubro)

Within Skadedyr
2013: Kongekrabbe (Hubro)
2016: Culturen (Hubro)

References 

Norwegian jazz upright-bassists
Male double-bassists
Jazz double-bassists
Norwegian jazz composers
Male jazz composers
Avant-garde jazz musicians
Norwegian University of Science and Technology alumni
Musicians from Haugesund
1988 births
Living people
21st-century double-bassists
21st-century Norwegian male musicians